Ibrahim Kironde Kabanda, is a businessman and entrepreneur in Uganda. He is a former chairman of the Uganda Revenue Authority, having served in that position from 2004 until 2010.

Businesses and investments
In 2015, Kabanda was the second largest non-institutional investor in the stock of Stanbic Bank (Uganda) Limited, with shareholding valued at UGX:6.7 billion.

Other responsibilities
In 2013, Muwenda Mutebi II, the reigning Kabaka of Buganda, gave power-of-attorney to three individuals, including Kabanda, to prosecute the National Water and Sewerage Corporation for constructing a sewerage treatment plant on his land in Lubigi, without his permission. The other two individuals were Prince Daudi Kintu Wasajja and Godfrey Kaaya Kavuma.

See also
List of wealthiest people in Uganda

References

External links
 Webpage of Uganda Revenue Authority
 Baganda hold most jobs in revenue body

Living people
Ganda people
Ugandan businesspeople
People from Central Region, Uganda
Date of birth missing (living people)
Year of birth missing (living people)